Rocco Urbisci is an American director, producer and film and television writer.

Urbisci has written films and television shows such as Richard Pryor's Jo Jo Dancer, Your Life Is Calling, The Richard Pryor Show and the made for television sequel to The Jerk entitled The Jerk, Too with Mark Blankfield replacing Steve Martin in the lead.

Urbisci worked frequently with comedian George Carlin and produced and directed many of Carlin's comedy specials.

He won an Emmy for producing the 1981 Lily Tomlin comedy special Lily: Sold Out.

References

External links

American male screenwriters
American television producers
American film producers
American television writers
American film directors
American television directors
Living people
American male television writers
Year of birth missing (living people)